Mostovskoy is an urban locality (an urban-type settlement) and the administrative center of Mostovsky District of Krasnodar Krai, Russia, located on the left bank of the Laba River. Population: 25,062(2020),

History
It was founded in 1894 or 1895 as the village of Mostovoye or Mostovskoye on the land of the former auls whose former inhabitants moved to Turkey. It was granted urban-type settlement status and given its present name on October 10, 1961.

Notable people
Association football player Roman Pavlyuchenko was born in Mostovskoy in 1981.

References

Urban-type settlements in Krasnodar Krai
Mostovsky District